Clostridium aciditolerans  is an anaerobic and spore-forming bacterium from the genus Clostridium which has been isolated from wetland sediments from Aiken in the United States.

References

 

Bacteria described in 2007
aciditolerans